Elaine is a given name, a variant of Elaina, Elayne and Helen. It may refer to:

Arts and entertainment
 Elaine (singer), South African singer
 Elaine Crombie, Australian actress
 Elaine Fifield (1930–1999), Australian ballerina
 Elaine Fine (born 1959), American musician and composer
 Elaine Goble (born 1956), Canadian visual artist
 Elaine M. Goodwin, British mosaic artist
 Elaine Hamilton-O'Neal (1920–2010), American artist
 Elaine Hendrix (born 1970), American actress
 Elaine May (born 1932), American film director, screenwriter and actress
Elaine Mukheli (born 1999), South African singer
Elaine Murphy (playwright), Irish playwright
 Elaine Paige (born 1948), English actress and singer
 Elaine Stritch (1925–2014), American actress
 Elaine Yiu (born 1980), Hong Kong actress

Others
 Elaine Brody (1922–2014), American gerontologist and sociologist
 Elaine Brown (born 1940), involved with a dispute with the US government
 Elaine Campione, Canadian woman who murdered her two children
 Elaine Chan, Hong Kong Olympic swimmer
 Elaine Chao (born 1953), Former United States Secretary of Labor
 Elaine Cheris (born 1946), American Olympic fencer
 Elaine Esposito (1934–1978), American who had held the record for longest coma 
 Elaine Gumbs-Vlaun (born 1944), St Maartener social worker and politician
 Elaine Ingham, American microbiologist and soil biology researcher
 Elaine Luria (born 1975), American politician
 Elaine E Moura (born 1982), Brazilian football (soccer) player
Elaine Marshall, American politician
Elaine McCoy, Canadian politician
Elaine Murray (born 1954), British politician
Elaine Murphy, Baroness Murphy, British politician
 Elaine Nolan (born 1981), Irish cricketer
Elaine Ron (1943-2010), American epidemiologist
 Elaine Thompson-Herah (born 1992), Jamaican sprinter

Fictional characters 
 Elaine, the Holy Maiden of the Fountain of Youth in the anime The Seven Deadly Sins
 Elaine (EastEnders), EastEnders character
 Elaine (legend), several Arthurian-legend characters, including:
 Elaine of Astolat
 Elaine of Corbenic
 Elaine Belloc, a character in the Lucifer comic series
 Elaine Benes, Seinfeld character
 Elaine Lefkowitz-Dallas, a character on the TV sitcom Soap
 Elaine Marley, Monkey Island character
 Elaine Miller, character in Almost Famous
 Elaine Nardo, Taxi character
 Elaine Peacock, EastEnders character
 Elaine Pownall, recurring character of the 2018-2019 show Siren
 Elaine Robinson, character in The Graduate

See also 
 Lo Po Bia Elaine, character in Tower of God

English feminine given names
English given names
Feminine given names